Mr. Echo is the twelfth single by the Japanese rock band Nico Touches the Walls, released on March 27, 2013. The single is available in a limited edition (CD+DVD) containing a bonus-DVD with highlights from their concerts in 2012, and a regular CD only edition. The song "Chain Reaction" was used as a commercial-song for New Balance Japan, and the song "Sweet Memories" is a cover song by the Japanese singer Matsuda Seiko.

Track listing

CD track listing
Mr. Echo
Chain Reaction (チェインリアクション)
Sweet Memories

Limited edition DVD track listing
-Choice collection2012- 
image training (from "ki/oon20" 2012.4.26 @ LIQUIDROOM)
Natsu no Daisankakkei (from "FREE LIVE in Yoyogi Park" 2012.5.16 @ Yoyogi Park Outdoor Stage) (夏の大三角形)
Te wo Tatake (from "HIGHER GROUND" 2012.7.28 @ Uminonakamichi Seaside Park Amphitheater) (手をたたけ)
Rappa to Musume (from "ALGORYHTMIQUE" 2012.11.16 @ ZEPP TOKYO) (ラッパと娘)

Chart Position
The single hit number 19 on the Oricon Chart.

External links
 Nico Touches the Walls official website

Nico Touches the Walls songs
2013 singles
2013 songs
Ki/oon Music singles
Song articles with missing songwriters